The Chase Foundation is a non-profit organization dedicated to making the Child Life Program available at no cost to patients 21 and under, and their families, at Children's Hospital Los Angeles. 

Chase Child Life Program addresses the social, emotional, and developmental needs of children dealing with the stress of illness and hospitalization. 

Established in 1970, the Chase Child Life Program was renamed in 2000 in honor of Chase Richards, whose parents co-founded the Chase Foundation to support this program. Robin D. Richards and Susan Richards lost their son Chase to cancer.

References

External links 

 The Chase Foundation

Medical and health foundations in the United States